Marly-le-Roi is a railway station in Marly-le-Roi, Yvelines, France. It lies on line L of Île-de-France's Transilien network.

References

Transilien
Railway stations in Yvelines
Railway stations in France opened in 1884